R. F. Strickland Company is a historic general store business in Concord, Georgia. The company's records from 1887 to 1914 are held by Emory University. It was added to the National Register of Historic Places on August 26, 1982. It is located at Railroad Street and McLendon Street.

The building was the center of the Strickland company empire, consisting of Strickland family farms and over three hundred

See also
National Register of Historic Places listings in Pike County, Georgia

References

External links 

 Stuart A. Rose Manuscript, Archives, and Rare Book Library, Emory University: R.F. Strickland (Firm : Concord, Ga.) records, 1887-1914

Buildings and structures in Pike County, Georgia
Commercial buildings on the National Register of Historic Places in Georgia (U.S. state)
Commercial buildings completed in 1907